A corporate spin-off, also known as a spin-out, or starburst or hive-off, is a type of corporate action where a company "splits off" a section as a separate business or creates a second incarnation, even if the first is still active. It is distinct from a sell-off, where a company sells a section to another company or firm in exchange for cash or securities.

Characteristics
Spin-offs are divisions of companies or organizations that then become independent businesses with assets, employees, intellectual property, technology, or existing products that are taken from the parent company. Shareholders of the parent company receive equivalent shares in the new company in order to compensate for the loss of equity in the original stocks. However, shareholders may then buy and sell stocks from either company independently; this potentially makes investment in the companies more attractive, as potential share purchasers can invest narrowly in the portion of the business they think will have the most growth.

In contrast, divestment can also sever one business from another, but the assets are sold off rather than retained under a renamed corporate entity.

Many times, the management team of the new company are from the same parent organization. Often, a spin-off offers the opportunity for a division to be backed by the company but not be affected by the parent company's image or history, giving potential to take existing ideas that had been languishing in an old environment and help them grow in a new environment. Spin-offs also allow high-growth divisions, once separated from other low-growth divisions, to command higher valuation multiples.

In most cases, the parent company or organization offers support doing one or more of the following:

 Investing equity in the new firm
 Being the first customer of the spin-off that helps create cash flow
 Providing incubation space (desk, chairs, phones, Internet access, etc.)
 Providing legal, finance, or technology services

All the support from the parent company is provided with the explicit purpose of helping the spin-off grow.

U.S. Securities and Exchange Commission
The United States Securities and Exchange Commission's (SEC) definition of "spin-off" is more precise. Spin-offs occur when the equity owners of the parent company receive equity stakes in the newly spun off company. For example, when Agilent Technologies was spun off from Hewlett-Packard (HP) in 1999, the stockholders of HP received Agilent stock. A company not considered a spin-off in the SEC's definition (but considered by the SEC as a technology transfer or licensing of technology to the new company) may also be called a spin-off in common usage.

Other definitions
A second definition of a spin-out is a firm formed when an employee or group of employees leaves an existing entity to form an independent start-up firm. The prior employer can be a firm, a university, or another organization. Spin-outs typically operate at arm's length from the previous organizations and have independent sources of financing, products, services, customers, and other assets. In some cases, the spin-out may license technology from the parent or supply the parent with products or services; conversely, they may become competitors. Such spin-outs are important sources of technological diffusion in high-tech industries.

Terms such as hive-up, hive down or hive across are sometime used for transferring a business to a parent company, a subsidiary company or a fellow subsidiary.

Reasons for spin-offs
One of the main reasons for what The Economist has dubbed the 2011 "starburst revival" is that "companies seeking buyers for parts of their business are not getting good offers from other firms, or from private equity". For example, Foster's Group, an Australian beverage company, was prepared to sell its wine business. However, due to the lack of a decent offer, it decided to spin off the wine business, which is now called Treasury Wine Estates.

Conglomerate discount
According to The Economist, another driving force of the proliferation of spin-offs is what it calls the "conglomerate discount" — that "stockmarkets value a diversified group at less than the sum of its parts".

Examples
Some examples of spin-offs (according to the SEC definition):

 Guidant was spun off from Eli Lilly and Company in 1994, formed from Lilly's Medical Devices and Diagnostics Division.
 Agilent Technologies spun off from Hewlett-Packard (HP) in 1999, formed from HP's former test-and-measurement equipment division. Later in 2014, Keysight was spun off from Agilent Technologies.
 Expedia Group was spun off from Microsoft in 1999, with its eponymous subsidiary Expedia.
 DreamWorks Animation was spun off from DreamWorks Pictures in 2004.
 Covidien was spun off from Tyco International in 2007.
 TE Connectivity was spun off from Tyco International in 2007.
 Cenovus Energy was spun off from Encana (now Ovintiv) in 2009.
 AOL was a Time Warner spin-off in 2009; this effectively was a demerger, as AOL had previously merged into Time Warner.
 Ocean Rig was spun off from DryShips in September 2011.
 News Corporation's publishing operations (and its broadcasting operations in Australia) were spun off as News Corp in 2013. The previous News Corporation's remaining media properties were retained under the name 21st Century Fox. In turn, 21st Century Fox was acquired by The Walt Disney Company in 2019, but most of its broadcast and cable properties were spun off to the new Fox Corporation while Disney retained the film and television production units. 
 After being acquired by Sega, Index Corporation's video game operations were re-branded as Atlus, the name of a predecessor company, while its contents and solution businesses were spun off as a new company using the Index Corporation name in 2013.
 Mallinckrodt Pharmaceuticals was spun off from Covidien in 2013.
Viacom was spun off from CBS in 1971.
Fortive and Envista were spun off from Danaher in 2016 and 2019 respectively.
In South Korea, the then-CJ E&M (now CJ ENM Entertainment Division) spun off its drama production and distribution division into a new subsidiary company called Studio Dragon in May 2016.

Examples following the second definition of spin-out:

 Fairchild Semiconductor was a spin-out of Shockley Transistor; the founders were Shockley's "traitorous eight"
 Intel was in turn a spin-out of Fairchild, as were many firms in the semiconductor industry

Academia
An example of companies created by technology transfer or licensing:

 Since 1997, Oxford University Innovation has helped create more than 70 spin-out companies, and now, on average, every two months a new company is spun out of "academic research generated within and owned by the University of Oxford". Over £266 million in external investment has been raised by spin-out companies since 2000, and five are currently listed on the London Stock Exchange's Alternative Investment Market.

See also
 Demerger
 Divestment
 Equity carve-out
 Stub (stock)
 Successor company

References

Further reading
 EIRMA (2003) "Innovation Through Spinning In and Out", Research Technology Management, Vol. 46, 63–64.
 
 Rohrbeck, R., Hölzle K. and H. G. Gemünden (2009): "Opening up for competitive advantage: How Deutsche Telekom creates an open innovation ecosystem", R&D Management, Vol. 39, S. 420–430.

External links
 

 
spin-off
Restructuring
Types of business entity